Maverick Antcliff (born 7 April 1993) is an Australian professional golfer currently playing on the European Tour. In 2019, he won the China Tour Order of Merit, the same year he achieved his first three professional wins.

Career
Antcliff hails from Beaudesert, Queensland, about an hour south of Brisbane, just like fellow golfer Jason Day. He attended Hills International College as a teenager.

Antcliff accepted a golf scholarship to Augusta State University, and played golf with the Jaguars' men's golf team 2013–2016. After turning pro in 2016 Antcliff found himself near the top of the leaderboard in a number of events on the Asian Tour and the PGA Tour of Australasia in 2017 and 2018, but wins proved elusive. His breakthrough came in 2019 when he claimed three wins from the first five events of the 2019 China Tour.

Following his dominant year on the China Tour where he recorded three wins, seven top fives, nine top tens and no missed cuts to win the Order of Merit with a points total that was nearly double the second place finisher's, Antcliff earned his European Tour card for 2020.

In his rookie season, Antcliff finished tied third at the Dubai Duty Free Irish Open. He was runner-up at the 2021 Canary Islands Championship, behind Garrick Higgo, after which he rose to 208th in the Official World Golf Ranking.

Professional wins (3)

China Tour wins (3)

Team appearances
Amateur
Australian Men's Interstate Teams Matches (representing Queensland): 2011

References

External links 
 
 
 

Australian male golfers
European Tour golfers
Sportspeople from Brisbane
1993 births
Living people